Wiro may refer to:

 WKSG (FM), a radio station (98.3 FM) licensed to serve Garrison, Kentucky, United States, which held the call sign WIRO in 2022
 WITO, a radio station (1230 AM) licensed to serve Ironton, Ohio, United States, which held the call sign WIRO from 1951 to 2022
 Wiro of Roermond (d. c. 700), Christian saint
 Wirö language, spoken in Colombia and Venezuela
 Wyoming Infrared Observatory, an astronomical observatory located in Wyoming, US.